Gal Ashaqi (also Romanized as Gal Āshāqī and Galāshaqī) is a village in Chaldoran-e Shomali Rural District, in the Central District of Chaldoran County, West Azerbaijan Province, Iran. At the 2006 census, its population was 401, in 77 families.  The decisive Battle of Chaldiran was fought nearby.

References 

Populated places in Chaldoran County